Uhlsport GmbH is a German sporting goods manufacturer. Originally established in 1948 as "Haase & Uhl OHG" and later renamed "Karl Uhl GmbH", the company became "uhlsport GmbH" in 1994. It is an international company which has its permanent headquarters in Balingen in Baden-Württemberg, Germany.

The company manufactures and distributes its products through the brands Uhlsport and Kempa.

History 

The company was founded in 1948 by Karl Uhl. Early production focussed on manufacturing leather studs for football boots, and in 1953 uhlsport also began to produce football boot soles for sports shoe manufacturers. In the years which followed, more products were added, including shin guards, sports bandages, footballs and goalkeeper gloves, until finally uhlsport GmbH had developed a full range of football equipment. Since 2002, the company has been operating a multi-brand strategy for football and handball.

Brands and products 
The brand "uhlsport" specializes in football, especially goalkeeper equipment. Since 2002, handball equipment has been marketed through the company's own "Kempa" brand. 

The German company operates an indirect distribution strategy with subsidiaries in France, Spain, and Sweden and with country managers in UK, Benelux, and Switzerland. Uhlsport has a further 80 distribution partners across the world. In 1998, the Uhl family sold the company to the Daiss family.

Sponsorship

Uhlsport is the official equipment supplier to 1. FC Köln and 1. FC Magdeburg,  As official ball sponsor uhlsport supports the French Ligue 1 and the French Ligue 2. The goalkeepers Alphonso Areola, Alexander Schwolow, Mike Maignan, Oliver Baumann, Odysseas Vlachodimos, Fabian Bredlow, Diant Ramaj, Christian Mathenia, Lukas Hradecky, Ron-Robert Zieler, Pauline Peyraud-Magnin, Yassine Bounou, Ofir Marciano, Anthony Lopes and others play with uhlsport gloves.

Kampa ist the official sponsor to HBW Balingen-Weilstetten, TVB 1898 Stuttgart, Bergischer HC, Buxtehuder SV (women) and HSG Bensheim/Auerbach (women).

Football

National teams

Africa

Club teams

Africa

 SOA
 Ghazl El Mahalla
 Gomhoriat Shebin
 FUS

America

 Deportivo Laferrere (from 2022 season)
 San Carlos

Asia

 Nassaji
 Paykan   
 Perspolis 
 Al-Nahda
 Nizwa
 Saham Club
 Suwaiq

Europe

 Bylis
 Egnatia
 Kastrioti
 Laçi
 Austria Lustenau
 Blau-Weiß Linz
 Mouscron
 Arda Kardzhali
 Cherno More Varna
 Maritsa Plovdiv
 Septemvri Sofia
 Slavia Sofia
 Hvidovre
 Silkeborg
 Chippenham Town
 Tallinna JK Legion
   Clermont Foot (from 2022-23 season)
 FC Magdeburg  (until 2022-23 season)
 Bonner SC
 SSV Reutlingen
 SSV Ulm
 Stuttgarter Kickers
 TSG Balingen
 VfR Garching
 Ballkani (from 2021-22 season)
 Ballymena United
 Dungannon Swifts
 Lisburn Distillery
 Warrenpoint Town
 Erzurumspor
 Alanyaspor
  Büyükşehir Belediye Erzurumspor

Associations and competitions
Uhlsport is the official supplier for the following leagues and associations:

  NIFL Premiership
  Ligi Kuu Tanzania Bara

Handball

Club teams

 HBW Balingen-Weilstetten
 Bergischer HC
 Buxtehuder SV
 TVB Stuttgart
 CSM București (women's)
 Gloria Bistrița (women's)
 Dunărea Brăila (women's)
 Gloria Buzău (women's)
 CSM București 
 Alingsås HK

). 1998

Volleyball

Club teams 

 Ganziantep Genckikspor

References

External links 

 

Sporting goods manufacturers of Germany
Sportswear brands
Companies based in Baden-Württemberg
Clothing companies established in 1948
1948 establishments in Germany